Christine Ann "Chris" Eaton (born January 5, 1954) is an American politician and member of the Minnesota Senate. A member of the Minnesota Democratic–Farmer–Labor Party (DFL), she represents District 40, which includes the cities of Brooklyn Center and Brooklyn Park in Hennepin County in the Twin Cities metropolitan area.

Early life, education, and career
Eaton graduated from Anoka-Ramsey Community College, where she earned her nursing degree.

Eaton is a registered nurse and a member of the Minnesota Nurses Association. She has been Director of Health Services at Mental Health Resources since 2009, and previously worked as a nurse at Ramsey County Mental Health Initiative from 1998 to 2008, and as a nurse and human services tech at Anoka Metro Regional Treatment Center from 1991 to 1998.

Minnesota Senate
She won a special election on October 18, 2011, held to fill a vacancy that arose upon the death of long-time Senator Linda Scheid on June 15, 2011. Following redistricting Eaton was placed in District 40. She ran unopposed in 2012 and was re-elected in 2016. Eaton was reelected in 2020, and is currently serving on the following committees:

 Environment and Natural Resources Finance
 Health and Human Services Finance and Policy
 Ranking Minority Chair of Human Services Licensing Policy

Personal life
Eaton and her husband, Tim Willson, are the parents of two children. He was mayor of Brooklyn Center, but lost the mayoral election in 2018 to Mike Elliot.

References

External links 

 Senator Chris Eaton official Minnesota Senate website
 Senator Chris Eaton official campaign website

Living people
1954 births
Democratic Party Minnesota state senators
People from Brooklyn Center, Minnesota
Women state legislators in Minnesota
Anoka-Ramsey Community College alumni
21st-century American politicians
21st-century American women politicians